The 2001 New York Yankees season was the 99th season for the Yankees. The team finished with a record of 95-65 finishing 13.5 games ahead of the Boston Red Sox. New York was managed by Joe Torre. The Yankees played at Yankee Stadium. Roger Clemens had sixteen straight wins, tying an American League mark shared by Walter Johnson, Lefty Grove, Schoolboy Rowe, and Smoky Joe Wood. Clemens would finish the season with the AL Cy Young Award and become the first pitcher to win six Cy Young Awards.

Another chapter was written in the story of the Yankee-Red Sox rivalry. On September 2, 2001, Mike Mussina came within one strike of a perfect game before surrendering a bloop single to Carl Everett. This was Mussina's third time he has taken a perfect game to or beyond the 8th inning. Coincidentally, it would have been the 3rd perfect game in for the Yankees in a span of 4 seasons and could have been the 4th perfect game in franchise history.

In the emotional times of September 2001 in New York City, following the September 11 attack on New York's World Trade Center, the Yankees defeated the Oakland A's three games to two in the ALDS, and then the Seattle Mariners, who had won 116 games, four games to one in the ALCS. By winning the pennant for a fourth straight year, the 1998–2001 Yankees joined the 1921–1924 New York Giants, and the Yankee teams of 1936–1939, 1949–1953, 1955–1958 and 1960–1964 as the only dynasties to reach at least four straight pennants. The Yankees had now won eleven consecutive postseason series over a four-year period. However, the Yankees lost the World Series in a dramatic 7 game series to the Arizona Diamondbacks, when Yankees star closer Mariano Rivera uncharacteristically lost the lead – and the Series – in the bottom of the ninth inning of the final game. With the loss, this marked the second time in five years that a team lost the World Series after taking a lead into the bottom of the ninth inning of Game 7 (following the Cleveland Indians in ) and the first time since  that the home team won the seventh game of a World Series.

Despite the loss in the series, Derek Jeter provided one bright spot. Despite a very poor series overall, batting under .200, he got the nickname, "Mr. November", for his walk-off home run in Game 4, though it began October 31, as the game ended in the first minutes of November 1. In calling the home run, Yankees broadcaster Michael Kay said "See ya! See ya! See ya! A home run for Derek Jeter! He is Mr. November! Oh what a home run by Derek Jeter!" He said this after noticing a fan's sign that said "Mr. November".

Also, during the emotional times following the attacks, Yankee Stadium played host to a memorial service, just before the Yankees played their first home game following the attacks. The service was titled "Prayer for America".

Offseason
November 21, 2000: Joe Oliver was signed as a free agent with the New York Yankees.
November 30, 2000: Mike Mussina was signed as a free agent with the New York Yankees.
December 7, 2000: Dwight Gooden signed as a free agent with the New York Yankees.
December 7, 2000: Luis Sojo was signed as a free agent with the New York Yankees.
December 11, 2000: Brandon Knight was drafted by the Minnesota Twins from the New York Yankees in the 2000 rule 5 draft.
February 15, 2001: Henry Rodriguez was signed as a free agent with the New York Yankees.
March 21, 2001: Drew Henson was traded by the Cincinnati Reds with Michael Coleman to the New York Yankees for Wily Mo Pena.
March 28, 2001: Glenallen Hill was traded by the New York Yankees to the Anaheim Angels for Darren Blakely (minors).
March 28, 2001: Brandon Knight was returned (earlier draft pick) by the Minnesota Twins to the New York Yankees.
March 30, 2001: Brandon Knight was released by the New York Yankees.

Notable transactions
April 1, 2001: Brandon Knight was signed as a free agent with the New York Yankees.
June 5, 2001: John Ford Griffin was drafted by the New York Yankees in the 1st round (23rd pick) of the 2001 amateur draft. Player signed June 14, 2001.
June 5, 2001: Bronson Sardinha was drafted by the New York Yankees in the 1st round (34th pick) of the 2001 amateur draft. Player signed June 13, 2001.
June 19, 2001: Henry Rodríguez was released by the New York Yankees.
June 20, 2001: Joe Oliver was released by the New York Yankees.
 July 4, 2001: Bobby Estalella was traded by the San Francisco Giants with Joe Smith (minors) to the New York Yankees for Brian Boehringer.
July 30, 2001: Sterling Hitchcock was traded by the San Diego Padres to the New York Yankees for Brett Jodie and Darren Blakely (minors).
August 31, 2001: Randy Velarde was traded by the Texas Rangers to the New York Yankees for players to be named later. The New York Yankees sent Randy Flores (October 12, 2001) and Rosman Garcia (October 11, 2001) to the Texas Rangers to complete the trade.

Season standings

Season summary

Record vs. opponents

Detailed records

Roster

Game log

Regular season

|- bgcolor="bbffbb"
| 1 || April 2 || Royals || 7–3 || Clemens (1–0) || Suppan (0–1) || — || Yankee Stadium || 55,814 || 1–0
|- bgcolor="bbffbb"
| 2 || April 4 || Royals || 8–2 || Pettitte (1–0) || Stein (0–1) || — || Yankee Stadium || 26,499 || 2–0
|- bgcolor="bbffbb"
| 3 || April 5 || Royals || 1–0 || Mussina (1–0) || Reichert (0–1) || Rivera (1) || Yankee Stadium || 26,696 || 3–0
|- bgcolor="ffbbbb"
| 4 || April 6 || Blue Jays || 4–13 || Loaiza (2–0) || Parker (0–1) || — || Yankee Stadium || 29,606 || 3–1
|- bgcolor="ffbbbb"
| 5 || April 7 || Blue Jays || 2–3 || Michalak (1–0) || O. Hernandez (0–1) || Koch (2) || Yankee Stadium || 30,487 || 3–2
|- bgcolor="bbffbb"
| 6 || April 8 || Blue Jays || 16–5 || Clemens (2–0) || Parris (0–2) || — || Yankee Stadium || 31,970 || 4–2
|- bgcolor="bbffbb"
| 7 || April 9 || @ Royals || 13–4 || Pettitte (2–0) || Stein (0–2) || — || Kauffman Stadium || 24,411 || 5–2
|- bgcolor="bbffbb"
| 8 || April 10 || @ Royals || 9–5 || Mendoza (1–0) || R. Hernandez (0–1) || — || Kauffman Stadium || 16,338 || 6–2
|- bgcolor="bbffbb"
| 9 || April 11 || @ Royals || 8–5 || Williams (1–0) || Meadows (0–2) || Rivera (2) || Kauffman Stadium || 19,175 || 7–2
|- bgcolor="ffbbbb"
| 10 || April 13 || @ Red Sox || 2–3  || Lowe (1–2) || Rivera (0–1) || — || Fenway Park || 33,124 || 7–3
|- bgcolor="bbffbb"
| 11 || April 14 || @ Red Sox || 3–2 || Stanton (1–0) || Schourek (0–1) || Rivera (3) || Fenway Park || 33,396 || 8–3
|- bgcolor="ffbbbb"
| 12 || April 15 || @ Red Sox || 4–5 || Garces (1–0) || Pettitte (2–1) || Arrojo (2) || Fenway Park || 32,127 || 8–4
|- bgcolor="ffbbbb"
| 13 || April 16 || @ Red Sox || 1–4 || Castillo (1–1) || Mussina (1–1) || Beck (1) || Fenway Park || 33,373 || 8–5
|- bgcolor="ffbbbb"
| 14 || April 17 || @ Blue Jays || 5–6 || Loaiza (3–0) || Keisler (0–1) || Koch (4) || SkyDome || 20,019 || 8–6
|- bgcolor="ffbbbb"
| 15 || April 18 || @ Blue Jays || 2–7 || Michalak (3–0) || O. Hernandez (0–2) || — || SkyDome || 19,770 || 8–7
|- bgcolor="bbffbb"
| 16 || April 19 || @ Blue Jays || 6–5  || Choate (1–0) || File (0–1) || Mendoza (1) || SkyDome || 24,684 || 9–7
|- bgcolor="bbffbb"
| 17 || April 20 || Red Sox || 6–1 || Pettitte (3–1) || Nomo (2–1) || — || Yankee Stadium || 54,366 || 10–7
|- bgcolor="ffbbbb"
| 18 || April 21 || Red Sox || 3–8 || Castillo (2–1) || Mussina (1–2) || — || Yankee Stadium || 55,483 || 10–8
|- bgcolor="bbffbb"
| 19 || April 22 || Red Sox || 4–3  || Rivera (1–1) || Lowe (1–3) || — || Yankee Stadium || 55,278 || 11–8
|- bgcolor="ffbbbb"
| 20 || April 24 || Mariners || 5–7 || Garcia (3–0) || Stanton (1–1) || Sasaki (10) || Yankee Stadium || 29,522 || 11–9
|- bgcolor="ffbbbb"
| 21 || April 25 || Mariners || 5–7 || Charlton (1–0) || Pettitte (3–2) || Sasaki (11) || Yankee Stadium || 23,684 || 11–10
|- bgcolor="ffbbbb"
| 22 || April 26 || Mariners || 3–7 || Moyer (4–0) || Mussina (1–3) || Rhodes (1) || Yankee Stadium || 30,218 || 11–11
|- bgcolor="bbffbb"
| 23 || April 27 || Athletics || 3–2 || Choate (2–0) || Mulder (2–2) || Rivera (4) || Yankee Stadium || 35,170 || 12–11
|- bgcolor="bbffbb"
| 24 || April 28 || Athletics || 7–6 || Lilly (1–0) || Hudson (2–3) || Rivera (5) || Yankee Stadium || 38,422 || 13–11
|- bgcolor="bbffbb"
| 25 || April 29 || Athletics || 3–1 || Clemens (3–0) || Zito (3–2) || Rivera (6) || Yankee Stadium || 50,572 || 14–11
|- bgcolor="ffbbbb"
| 26 || April 30 || @ Twins || 1–2 || Radke (5–0) || Pettitte (3–3) || — || Hubert H. Humphrey Metrodome || 24,629 || 14–12

|- bgcolor="bbffbb"
| 27 || May 1 || @ Twins || 4–0 || Mussina (2–3) || Milton (3–2) || — || Hubert H. Humphrey Metrodome || 24,505 || 15–12
|- bgcolor="ffbbbb"
| 28 || May 2 || @ Twins || 2–4 || Mays (4–1) || O. Hernandez (0–3) || Hawkins (9) || Hubert H. Humphrey Metrodome || 36,825 || 15–13
|- bgcolor="bbffbb"
| 29 || May 3 || @ Orioles || 7–5 || Mendoza (2–0) || Paronto (1–1) || Rivera (7) || Oriole Park at Camden Yards || 40,218 || 16–13
|- bgcolor="bbffbb"
| 30 || May 4 || @ Orioles || 6–5 || Stanton (2–1) || Paronto (1–2) || Rivera (8) || Oriole Park at Camden Yards || 43,133 || 17–13
|- bgcolor="bbffbb"
| 31 || May 5 || @ Orioles || 5–2 || Pettitte (4–3) || Roberts (4–1) || Boehringer (1) || Oriole Park at Camden Yards || 47,726 || 18–13
|- bgcolor="bbffbb"
| 32 || May 6 || @ Orioles || 2–1 || Mussina (3–3) || Trombley (1–1) || Rivera (9) || Oriole Park at Camden Yards || 47,740 || 19–13
|- bgcolor="ffbbbb"
| 33 || May 8 || Twins || 0–2 || Milton (4–2) || O. Hernandez (0–4) || — || Yankee Stadium || 29,326 || 19–14
|- bgcolor="bbffbb"
| 34 || May 9 || Twins || 2–0 || Clemens (4–0) || Mays (4–2) || Rivera (10) || Yankee Stadium || 23,280 || 20–14
|- bgcolor="ffbbbb"
| 35 || May 10 || Twins || 4–5  || Guardado (2–0) || Rivera (1–2) || Hawkins (11) || Yankee Stadium || 29,100 || 20–15
|- bgcolor="bbffbb"
| 36 || May 11 || Orioles || 14–5 || Mussina (4–3) || Roberts (4–2) || Mendoza (2) || Yankee Stadium || 40,433 || 21–15
|- bgcolor="bbffbb"
| 37 || May 12 || Orioles || 8–5 || Stanton (3–1) || Towers (1–1) || Rivera (11) || Yankee Stadium || 48,288 || 22–15
|- bgcolor="ffbbbb"
| 38 || May 13 || Orioles || 5–10  || Ryan (2–0) || Rivera (1–3) || — || Yankee Stadium || 39,819 || 22–16
|- bgcolor="ffbbbb"
| 39 || May 15 || @ Athletics || 2–3  || Guthrie (2–0) || Mendoza (2–1) || — || Network Associates Coliseum || 24,351 || 22–17
|- bgcolor="ffbbbb"
| 40 || May 16 || @ Athletics || 3–4  || Guthrie (3–0) || Boehringer (0–1) || — || Network Associates Coliseum || 43,932 || 22–18
|- bgcolor="ffbbbb"
| 41 || May 17 || @ Athletics || 3–8 || Bradford (2–1) || Mussina (4–4) || — || Network Associates Coliseum || 31,073 || 22–19
|- bgcolor="bbffbb"
| 42 || May 18 || @ Mariners || 14–10 || Mendoza (3–1) || Halama (3–4) || — || Safeco Field || 45,794 || 23–19
|- bgcolor="bbffbb"
| 43 || May 19 || @ Mariners || 2–1  || Stanton (4–1) || Sasaki (0–2) || Rivera (12) || Safeco Field || 45,880 || 24–19
|- bgcolor="ffbbbb"
| 44 || May 20 || @ Mariners || 2–6 || Sele (6–0) || Clemens (4–1) || — || Safeco Field || 45,953 || 24–20
|- bgcolor="bbbbbb"
| – || May 22 || Red Sox || colspan=8|Postponed (rain) Rescheduled for June 4
|- bgcolor="bbffbb"
| 45 || May 23 || Red Sox || 7–3 || Pettitte (5–3) || Cone (0–1) || — || Yankee Stadium || 44,108 || 25–20
|- bgcolor="bbffbb"
| 46 || May 24 || Red Sox || 2–1 || Mussina (5–4) || Martinez (6–1) || Rivera (13) || Yankee Stadium || 55,592 || 26–20
|- bgcolor="ffbbbb"
| 47 || May 25 || @ Indians || 4–6 || Rodriguez (2–1) || O. Hernandez (0–5) || Wickman (9) || Jacobs Field || 42,455 || 26–21
|- bgcolor="bbffbb"
| 48 || May 26 || @ Indians || 12–5 || Clemens (5–1) || Sabathia (5–2) || — || Jacobs Field || 42,528 || 27–21
|- bgcolor="bbffbb"
| 49 || May 27 || @ Indians || 6–2 || Lilly (2–0) || Colon (4–5) || Rivera (14) || Jacobs Field || 42,570 || 28–21
|- bgcolor="bbffbb"
| 50 || May 28 || @ Red Sox || 4–3 || Pettitte (6–3) || Schourek (0–3) || Rivera (15) || Fenway Park || 33,125 || 29–21
|- bgcolor="ffbbbb"
| 51 || May 30 || @ Red Sox || 0–3 || Martinez (7–1) || Mussina (5–5) || Lowe (5) || Fenway Park || 33,711 || 29–22

|- bgcolor="ffbbbb"
| 52 || June 1 || Indians || 4–7  || Sabathia (6–2) || Lilly (2–1) || Rincon (1) || Yankee Stadium || 42,032 || 29–23
|- bgcolor="bbffbb"
| 53 || June 2 || Indians || 9–4 || Clemens (6–1) || Colon (4–6) || Rivera (16) || Yankee Stadium || 46,618 || 30–23
|- bgcolor="ffbbbb"
| 54 || June 3 || Indians || 3–4 || Nagy (1–0) || Pettitte (6–4) || Wickman (12) || Yankee Stadium || 47,300 || 30–24
|- bgcolor="bbffbb"
| 55 || June 4 || Red Sox || 7–6 || Rivera (2–3) || Beck (1–3) || — || Yankee Stadium || 41,771 || 31–24
|- bgcolor="ffbbbb"
| 56 || June 5 || Orioles || 3–10 || Johnson (5–3) || Mussina (5–6) || — || Yankee Stadium || 30,605 || 31–25
|- bgcolor="bbffbb"
| 57 || June 6 || Orioles || 7–4 || Stanton (5–1) || Groom (1–1) || Rivera (17) || Yankee Stadium || 25,137 || 32–25
|- bgcolor="bbffbb"
| 58 || June 7 || Orioles || 4–0 || Clemens (7–1) || Ponson (3–4) || — || Yankee Stadium || 30,786 || 33–25
|- bgcolor="bbffbb"
| 59 || June 8 || Braves || 7–4 || Pettitte (7–4) || Glavine (6–4) || Rivera (18) || Yankee Stadium || 50,090 || 34–25
|- bgcolor="ffbbbb"
| 60 || June 9 || Braves || 6–10 || Cabrera (4–1) || Choate (2–1) || Rocker (17) || Yankee Stadium || 55,107 || 34–26
|- bgcolor="ffbbbb"
| 61 || June 10 || Braves || 1–4 || Maddux (6–5) || Mussina (5–7) || Rocker (18) || Yankee Stadium || 41,392 || 34–27
|- bgcolor="ffbbbb"
| 62 || June 12 || Expos || 1–2  || Strickland (1–3) || Mendoza (3–2) || — || Yankee Stadium || 30,034 || 34–28
|- bgcolor="bbffbb"
| 63 || June 13 || Expos || 9–3 || Clemens (8–1) || Irabu (0–2) || — || Yankee Stadium || 24,960 || 35–28
|- bgcolor="bbffbb"
| 64 || June 14 || Expos || 9–6 || Keisler (1–1) || Yoshii (2–3) || Rivera (19) || Yankee Stadium || 33,306 || 36–28
|- bgcolor="bbffbb"
| 65 || June 15 || @ Mets || 5–4 || Mendoza (4–2) || Leiter (3–5) || Rivera (20) || Shea Stadium || 54,110 || 37–28
|- bgcolor="bbffbb"
| 66 || June 16 || @ Mets || 2–1 || Mussina (6–7) || Appier (4–6) || Rivera (21) || Shea Stadium || 54,195 || 38–28
|- bgcolor="ffbbbb"
| 67 || June 17 || @ Mets || 7–8 || Wendell (2–2) || Almanzar (0–1) || Benitez (11) || Shea Stadium || 54,399 || 38–29
|- bgcolor="bbffbb"
| 68 || June 18 || @ Tigers || 10–1 || Clemens (9–1) || Weaver (6–7) || — || Comerica Park || 29,365 || 39–29
|- bgcolor="ffbbbb"
| 69 || June 19 || @ Tigers || 1–7 || Sparks (5–2) || Keisler (1–2) || — || Comerica Park || 24,171 || 39–30
|- bgcolor="ffbbbb"
| 70 || June 20 || @ Tigers || 2–5 || Holt (6–5) || A. Hernandez (0–1) || Anderson (6) || Comerica Park || 23,618 || 39–31
|- bgcolor="bbbbbb"
| – || June 21 || @ Tigers || colspan=8|Postponed (rain) Rescheduled for July 18
|- bgcolor="bbffbb"
| 71 || June 22 || @ Devil Rays || 6–3 || Mussina (7–7) || Lopez (3–10) || Rivera (22) || Tropicana Field || 24,718 || 40–31
|- bgcolor="bbffbb"
| 72 || June 23 || @ Devil Rays || 2–1 || Clemens (10–1) || Wallace (0–1) || Rivera (23) || Tropicana Field || 27,816 || 41–31
|- bgcolor="ffbbbb"
| 73 || June 24 || @ Devil Rays || 4–5 || Phelps (1–1) || Stanton (5–2) || — || Tropicana Field || 27,999 || 41–32
|- bgcolor="bbffbb"
| 74 || June 25 || Indians || 8–7 || Witasick (6–2) || Rincon (1–1) || Rivera (24) || Yankee Stadium || 40,852 || 42–32
|- bgcolor="ffbbbb"
| 75 || June 26 || Indians || 3–5 || Nagy (2–2) || A. Hernandez (0–2) || Rocker (21) || Yankee Stadium || 40,346 || 42–33
|- bgcolor="bbffbb"
| 76 || June 27 || Indians || 15–5 || Mussina (8–7) || Sabathia (7–3) || — || Yankee Stadium || 45,539 || 43–33
|- bgcolor="bbffbb"
| 77 || June 29 || Devil Rays || 7–5 || Clemens (11–1) || Rekar (1–9) || Rivera (25) || Yankee Stadium || 38,416 || 44–33
|- bgcolor="bbffbb"
| 78 || June 30 || Devil Rays || 5–4 || Stanton (6–2) || Creek (2–2) || Rivera (26) || Yankee Stadium || 42,544 || 45–33

|- bgcolor="bbffbb"
| 79 || July 1 || Devil Rays || 6–1 || Pettitte (8–4) || Sturtze (3–7) || — || Yankee Stadium || 41,983 || 46–33
|- bgcolor="bbffbb"
| 80 || July 2 || Devil Rays || 7–1 || Mussina (9–7) || Lopez (3–11) || — || Yankee Stadium || 43,029 || 47–33
|- bgcolor="bbffbb"
| 81 || July 3 || @ Orioles || 10–6 || Mendoza (5–2) || Mercedes (4–9) || — || Oriole Park at Camden Yards || 47,702 || 48–33
|- bgcolor="bbffbb"
| 82 || July 4 || @ Orioles || 4–3 || Clemens (12–1) || Maduro (0–2) || Rivera (27) || Oriole Park at Camden Yards || 47,355 || 49–33
|- bgcolor="bbffbb"
| 83 || July 5 || @ Orioles || 6–3 || Lilly (3–1) || Towers (6–3) || Rivera (28) || Oriole Park at Camden Yards || 44,635 || 50–33
|- bgcolor="bbffbb"
| 84 || July 6 || Mets || 8–3 || Pettitte (9–4) || Leiter (4–8) || Mendoza (3) || Yankee Stadium || 55,534 || 51–33
|- bgcolor="ffbbbb"
| 85 || July 7 || Mets || 0–3  || Franco (4–1) || Rivera (2–4) || Benitez (18) || Yankee Stadium || 55,589 || 51–34
|- bgcolor="bbffbb"
| 86 || July 8 || Mets || 4–1 || Mendoza (6–2) || Wendell (3–3) || Rivera (29) || Yankee Stadium || 55,528 || 52–34
|- bgcolor="bbcaff"
| colspan=10 | 72nd All-Star Game in Seattle, Washington
|- bgcolor="ffbbbb"
| 87 || July 12 || @ Marlins || 3–9 || Burnett (6–5) || Mussina (9–8) || — || Pro Player Stadium || 32,629 || 52–35
|- bgcolor="ffbbbb"
| 88 || July 13 || @ Marlins || 1–11 || Smith (5–5) || Lilly (3–2) || — || Pro Player Stadium || 44,313 || 52–36
|- bgcolor="bbffbb"
| 89 || July 14 || @ Marlins || 5–4  || Rivera (3–4) || Alfonseca (3–3) || Mendoza (4) || Pro Player Stadium || 39,583 || 53–36
|- bgcolor="ffbbbb"
| 90 || July 15 || @ Phillies || 3–9 || Person (7–5) || Pettitte (9–5) || — || Veterans Stadium || 59,470 || 53–37
|- bgcolor="bbffbb"
| 91 || July 16 || @ Phillies || 6–3  || Stanton (7–2) || Telemaco (5–5) || Rivera (30) || Veterans Stadium || 46,446 || 54–37
|- bgcolor="bbffbb"
| 92 || July 17 || @ Phillies || 4–1  || Choate (3–1) || Gomes (4–3) || Rivera (31) || Veterans Stadium || 47,529 || 55–37
|- bgcolor="bbffbb"
| 93 || July 18  || @ Tigers || 8–5 || Clemens (13–1) || Sparks (7–4) || Rivera (32) || Comerica Park || 14,800 || 56–37
|- bgcolor="ffbbbb"
| 94 || July 18  || @ Tigers || 4–12 || Santos (2–2) || Lilly (3–3) || — || Comerica Park || 33,216 || 56–38
|- bgcolor="ffbbbb"
| 95 || July 19 || @ Tigers || 2–11 || Lima (3–3) || Pettitte (9–6) || — || Comerica Park || 35,320 || 56–39
|- bgcolor="ffbbbb"
| 96 || July 20 || Blue Jays || 4–10 || Loaiza (6–9) || Jodie (0–1) || — || Yankee Stadium || 46,634 || 56–40
|- bgcolor="ffbbbb"
| 97 || July 21 || Blue Jays || 3–5 || Quantrill (8–2) || Rivera (3–5) || Koch (19) || Yankee Stadium || 55,264 || 56–41
|- bgcolor="bbffbb"
| 98 || July 22 || Blue Jays || 7–3 || Mussina (10–8) || Carpenter (7–7) || — || Yankee Stadium || 51,132 || 57–41
|- bgcolor="bbffbb"
| 99 || July 23 || Blue Jays || 7–2 || Clemens (14–1) || Parris (4–6) || — || Yankee Stadium || 38,573 || 58–41
|- bgcolor="bbffbb"
| 100 || July 24 || Tigers || 6–5 || Pettitte (10–6) || Sparks (7–5) || Rivera (33) || Yankee Stadium || 34,519 || 59–41
|- bgcolor="bbffbb"
| 101 || July 25 || Tigers || 4–2 || Witasick (7–2) || Lima (3–4) || Rivera (34) || Yankee Stadium || 34,480 || 60–41
|- bgcolor="bbffbb"
| 102 || July 26 || Tigers || 14–8 || Mendoza (7–2) || Holt (7–8) || — || Yankee Stadium || 45,221 || 61–41
|- bgcolor="bbffbb"
| 103 || July 27 || @ Blue Jays || 9–1 || Mussina (11–8) || Carpenter (7–8) || — || SkyDome || 36,666 || 62–41
|- bgcolor="bbffbb"
| 104 || July 28 || @ Blue Jays || 12–1 || Clemens (15–1) || Escobar (2–5) || — || SkyDome || 44,105 || 63–41
|- bgcolor="bbffbb"
| 105 || July 29 || @ Blue Jays || 9–3 || Pettitte (11–6) || Hamilton (5–8) || — || SkyDome || 40,149 || 64–41
|- bgcolor="ffbbbb"
| 106 || July 31 || Rangers || 2–6 || Oliver (9–6) || Lilly (3–4) || Zimmerman (21) || Yankee Stadium || 45,978 || 64–42

|- bgcolor="bbffbb"
| 107 || August 1 || Rangers || 9–7 || Hitchcock (3–1) || Bell (4–6) || Rivera (35) || Yankee Stadium || 41,714 || 65–42
|- bgcolor="ffbbbb"
| 108 || August 2 || Rangers || 2–12 || Myette (1–1) || Mussina (11–9) || — || Yankee Stadium || 52,169 || 65–43
|- bgcolor="bbffbb"
| 109 || August 3 || Angels || 4–2 || Pettitte (12–6) || Washburn (9–5) || Rivera (36) || Yankee Stadium || 40,490 || 66–43
|- bgcolor="bbffbb"
| 110 || August 4 || Angels || 5–4 || Rivera (4–5) || Levine (5–6) || — || Yankee Stadium || 46,416 || 67–43
|- bgcolor="ffbbbb"
| 111 || August 5 || Angels || 3–4 || Ortiz (10–7) || Mendoza (7–3) || Percival (29) || Yankee Stadium || 48,978 || 67–44
|- bgcolor="ffbbbb"
| 112 || August 6 || Angels || 1–3 || Pote (2–0) || Hitchock (3–2) || Percival (30) || Yankee Stadium || 40,232 || 67–45
|- bgcolor="ffbbbb"
| 113 || August 7 || @ Devil Rays || 2–3 || Sturtze (7–9) || Mussina (11–10) || Yan (15) || Tropicana Field || 22,429 || 67–46
|- bgcolor="bbffbb"
| 114 || August 8 || @ Devil Rays || 16–1 || Pettitte (13–6) || Bierbrodt (2–4) || — || Tropicana Field || 18,830 || 68–46
|- bgcolor="bbffbb"
| 115 || August 9 || @ Devil Rays || 4–3 || Mendoza (8–3) || Yan (3–5) || Rivera (37) || Tropicana Field || 21,223 || 69–46
|- bgcolor="ffbbbb"
| 116 || August 10 || @ Athletics || 1–8 || Lidle (7–5) || Lilly (3–5) || — || Network Associates Coliseum || 38,728 || 69–47
|- bgcolor="ffbbbb"
| 117 || August 11 || @ Athletics || 6–8 || Magnante (1–1) || Hitchock (3–3) || Isringhausen (23) || Network Associates Coliseum || 45,253 || 69–48
|- bgcolor="ffbbbb"
| 118 || August 12 || @ Athletics || 2–4 || Mulder (15–6) || Stanton (7–3) || — || Network Associates Coliseum || 47,725 || 69–49
|- bgcolor="bbffbb"
| 119 || August 14 || Devil Rays || 5–3 || Pettitte (14–6) || Kennedy (3–8) || Rivera (38) || Yankee Stadium || 34,521 || 70–49
|- bgcolor="bbffbb"
| 120 || August 15 || Devil Rays || 10–3 || Clemens (16–1) || Wilson (5–8) || — || Yankee Stadium || 32,103 || 71–49
|- bgcolor="bbffbb"
| 121 || August 16 || Devil Rays || 12–5 || Hitchock (4–3) || Rupe (5–10) || — || Yankee Stadium || 43,600 || 72–49
|- bgcolor="bbffbb"
| 122 || August 17 || Mariners || 4–0 || Mussina (12–10) || Abbott (12–3) || Mendoza (5) || Yankee Stadium || 54,616 || 73–49
|- bgcolor="ffbbbb"
| 123 || August 18 || Mariners || 6–7 || Rhodes (8–0) || Lilly (3–6) || Sasaki (38) || Yankee Stadium || 55,294 || 73–50
|- bgcolor="ffbbbb"
| 124 || August 19 || Mariners || 2–10 || Moyer (14–5) || Pettitte (14–7) || — || Yankee Stadium || 54,339 || 73–51
|- bgcolor="bbffbb"
| 125 || August 20 || @ Rangers || 9–5 || Stanton (8–3) || Moreno (3–3) || — || The Ballpark in Arlington || 35,125 || 74–51
|- bgcolor="ffbbbb"
| 126 || August 21 || @ Rangers || 3–13 || Davis (7–8) || O. Hernandez (0–6) || — || The Ballpark in Arlington || 34,940 || 74–52
|- bgcolor="ffbbbb"
| 127 || August 22 || @ Rangers || 1–8 || Oliver (10–8) || Mussina (12–11) || — || The Ballpark in Arlington || 33,442 || 74–53
|- bgcolor="bbffbb"
| 128 || August 23 || @ Rangers || 5–2 || Hitchock (5–3) || Bell (4–8) || Rivera (39) || The Ballpark in Arlington || 36,158 || 75–53
|- bgcolor="ffbbbb"
| 129 || August 24 || @ Angels || 2–6 || Hasegawa (4–4) || Pettitte (14–8) || — || Edison International Field of Anaheim || 43,489 || 75–54
|- bgcolor="bbffbb"
| 130 || August 25 || @ Angels || 7–5 || Clemens (17–1) || Valdez (8–8) || Rivera (40) || Edison International Field of Anaheim || 43,398 || 76–54
|- bgcolor="ffbbbb"
| 131 || August 26 || @ Angels || 6–7  || Percival (4–2) || Stanton (8–4) || — || Edison International Field of Anaheim || 41,660 || 76–55
|- bgcolor="bbffbb"
| 132 || August 28 || Blue Jays || 4–0 || Mussina (13–11) || Loaiza (9–11) || Rivera (41) || Yankee Stadium || 37,450 || 77–55
|- bgcolor="ffbbbb"
| 133 || August 29 || Blue Jays || 2–3 || Halladay (3–1) || Hitchock (5–4) || Koch (30) || Yankee Stadium || 36,855 || 77–56
|- bgcolor="bbffbb"
| 134 || August 30 || Blue Jays || 5–4  || Witasick (8–2) || Eyre (0–1) || — || Yankee Stadium || 42,537 || 78–56
|- bgcolor="bbffbb"
| 135 || August 31 || @ Red Sox || 3–1 || Clemens (18–1) || Lowe (4–10) || Rivera (42) || Yankee Stadium || 33,501 || 79–56
|-

|- bgcolor="bbffbb"
| 136 || September 1 || @ Red Sox || 2–1 || O. Hernandez (1–6) || Urbina (2–2) || Rivera (43) || Fenway Park || 33,084 || 80–56
|- bgcolor="bbffbb"
| 137 || September 2 || @ Red Sox || 1–0 || Mussina (14–11) || Cone (8–4) || — || Fenway Park || 33,734 || 81–56
|- bgcolor="bbffbb"
| 138 || September 3 || @ Blue Jays || 7–5 || Wohlers (4–1) || Koch (2–5) || Mendoza (6) || SkyDome || 28,404 || 82–56
|- bgcolor="ffbbbb"
| 139 || September 4 || @ Blue Jays || 0–14 || Carpenter (9–11) || Pettitte (14–9) || — || SkyDome || 20,036 || 82–57
|- bgcolor="bbffbb"
| 140 || September 5 || @ Blue Jays || 4–3 || Clemens (19–1) || Escobar (6–6) || Rivera (44) || SkyDome || 29,235 || 83–57
|- bgcolor="bbffbb"
| 141 || September 7 || Red Sox || 3–2 || O. Hernandez (2–6) || Martinez (7–3) || Rivera (45) || Yankee Stadium || 55,524 || 84–57
|- bgcolor="bbffbb"
| 142 || September 8 || Red Sox || 9–2 || Mussina (15–11) || Cone (8–5) || — || Yankee Stadium || 55,316 || 85–57
|- bgcolor="bbffbb"
| 143 || September 9 || Red Sox || 7–2 || Pettitte (15–9) || Nomo (11–8) || — || Yankee Stadium || 55,318 || 86–57
|- bgcolor="bbbbbb"
| – || September 10 || Red Sox || colspan=8|Cancelled (rain)
|- bgcolor="bbbbbb"
| – || September 11 || White Sox || colspan=8 |Postponed (9/11 attacks) Rescheduled for October 1
|- bgcolor="bbbbbb"
| – || September 12 || White Sox || colspan=8 |Postponed (9/11 attacks) Rescheduled for October 2
|- bgcolor="bbbbbb"
| – || September 13 || White Sox || colspan=8 |Postponed (9/11 attacks) Rescheduled for October 3
|- bgcolor="bbbbbb"
| – || September 14 || @ Devil Rays || colspan=8 |Postponed (9/11 attacks) Rescheduled for October 4
|- bgcolor="bbbbbb"
| – || September 15 || @ Devil Rays || colspan=8 |Postponed (9/11 attacks) Rescheduled for October 5
|- bgcolor="bbbbbb"
| – || September 16 || @ Devil Rays || colspan=8 |Postponed (9/11 attacks) Rescheduled for October 6
|- bgcolor="bbbbbb"
| – || September 17 || @ Devil Rays || colspan=8 |Postponed (9/11 attacks) Rescheduled for October 7
|- bgcolor="bbffbb"
| 144 || September 18 || @ White Sox || 11–3 || O. Hernandez (3–6) || Buehrle (13–8) || — || Comiskey Park || 22,785 || 87–57
|- bgcolor="bbffbb"
| 145 || September 19 || @ White Sox || 6–3 || Clemens (20–1) || Glover (4–3) || Rivera (46) || Comiskey Park || 18,465 || 88–57
|- bgcolor="ffbbbb"
| 146 || September 20 || @ White Sox || 5–7 || Lowe (8–4) || Pettitte (15–10) || Foulke (39) || Comiskey Park || 22,284 || 88–58
|- bgcolor="ffbbbb"
| 147 || September 21 || @ Orioles || 6–7 || Roberts (8–9) || Rivera (4–6) || — || Oriole Park at Camden Yards || 47.099 || 88–59
|- bgcolor="ffbbbb"
| 148 || September 22 || @ Orioles || 2–11 || Douglass (1–1) || Hitchock (5–5) || — || Oriole Park at Camden Yards || 47.068 || 88–60
|- bgcolor="bbffbb"
| 149 || September 23 || @ Orioles || 5–4  || Stanton (9–4) || Parrish (1–2) || Rivera (47) || Oriole Park at Camden Yards || 46.071 || 89–60
|- bgcolor="ffbbbb"
| 150 || September 25 || Devil Rays || 0–4 || Sturtze (9–12) || Clemens (20–2) || — || Yankee Stadium || 33,777 || 89–61
|- bgcolor="bbffbb"
| 151 || September 26 || Devil Rays || 5–1 || Lilly (4–6) || Wilson (7–9) || — || Yankee Stadium || 23,352 || 90–61
|- bgcolor="bbffbb"
| 152 || September 28 || Orioles || 7–0 || Mussina (16–11) || Johnson (10–12) || — || Yankee Stadium || 42,066 || 91–61
|- bgcolor="ffbbbb"
| 153 || September 29 || Orioles || 2–7 || Maduro (5–6) || O. Hernandez (3–7) || — || Yankee Stadium || 55,310 || 91–62
|- bgcolor="D3D3D3"
| 154 || September 30 || Orioles || 1–1  || colspan=3|Game called (rain) || Yankee Stadium || 55,351 || 91–62
|-

|- bgcolor="bbffbb"
| 155 || October 1 || White Sox || 8–1 || Hitchock (6–5) || Wells (10–10) || — || Yankee Stadium || 8,112 || 92–62
|- bgcolor="bbffbb"
| 156 || October 2 || White Sox || 6–4 || Lilly (5–6) || Wright (5–3) || Rivera (48) || Yankee Stadium || 10,480 || 93–62
|- bgcolor="bbffbb"
| 157 || October 3 || White Sox || 2–1 || Mussina (17–11) || Garland (6–7) || Rivera (49) || Yankee Stadium || 14,895 || 94–62
|- bgcolor="ffbbbb"
| 158 || October 4 || @ Devil Rays || 1–4 || Bierbrodt (5–6) || A. Hernandez (0–3) || Yan (21) || Tropicana Field || 15,265 || 94–63
|- bgcolor="ffbbbb"
| 159 || October 5 || @ Devil Rays || 4–8 || Kennedy (7–8) || Clemens (20–3) || Zambrano (2) || Tropicana Field || 22,028 || 94–64
|- bgcolor="ffbbbb"
| 160 || October 6 || @ Devil Rays || 2–5 || Sturtze (11–12) || Mendoza (8–4) || Yan (22) || Tropicana Field || 25,511 || 94–65
|- bgcolor="bbffbb"
| 161 || October 7 || @ Devil Rays || 1–0 || O. Hernandez (4–7) || Colome (2–3) || Rivera (50) || Tropicana Field || 24,075 || 95–65
|-

Postseason

|- align="center" bgcolor="ffbbbb"
| 1 || October 10 || Athletics || 3–5 || Mulder (1–0) || Clemens (0–1) || Isringhausen (1) || Yankee Stadium || 56,697 || 0–1
|- align="center" bgcolor="ffbbbb"
| 2 || October 11 || Athletics || 0–2 || Hudson (1–0) || Pettitte (0–1) || Isringhausen (2) || Yankee Stadium || 56,684 || 0–2
|- align="center" bgcolor="bbffbb"
| 3 || October 13 || @ Athletics || 1–0 || Mussina (1–0) || Zito (0–1) || Rivera (1) || Network Associates Coliseum || 55,861 || 1–2
|- align="center" bgcolor="bbffbb"
| 4 || October 14 || @ Athletics || 9–2 || Hernandez (1–0) || Lidle (0–1) || || Network Associates Coliseum || 43,681 || 2–2
|- align="center" bgcolor="bbffbb"
| 5 || October 15 || Athletics || 5–3 || Stanton (1–0) || Mulder (1–1) || Rivera (2) || Yankee Stadium || 56,642 || 3–2
|-

|- align="center" bgcolor="bbffbb"
| 1 || October 17 || @ Mariners || 4–2 || Pettitte (1–0) || Sele (0–1) || Rivera (1) || Safeco Field || 47,644 || 1–0
|- align="center" bgcolor="bbffbb"
| 2 || October 18 || @ Mariners || 3–2 || Mussina (1–0) || Garcia (0–1) || Rivera (2) || Safeco Field || 47,791 || 2–0
|- align="center" bgcolor="ffbbbb"
| 3 || October 20 || Mariners || 3–14 || Moyer (1–0) || Hernandez (0–1) || || Yankee Stadium || 56,517 || 2–1
|- align="center" bgcolor="bbffbb"
| 4 || October 21 || Mariners || 3–1 || Rivera (1–0) || Sasaki (0–1) || || Yankee Stadium || 56,375 || 3–1
|- align="center" bgcolor="bbffbb"
| 5 || October 22 || Mariners || 12–3 || Pettitte (2–0) || Sele (0–2) || || Yankee Stadium || 56,370 || 4–1
|-

|- align="center" bgcolor="ffbbbb"
| 1 || October 27 || @ Diamondbacks || 1–9 || Schilling (1–0) || Mussina (0–1) || || Bank One Ballpark || 49,646 || 0–1
|- align="center" bgcolor="ffbbbb"
| 2 || October 28 || @ Diamondbacks || 0–4 || Johnson (1–0) || Pettitte (0–1) || || Bank One Ballpark || 49,646 || 0–2
|- align="center" bgcolor="bbffbb"
| 3 || October 30 || Diamondbacks || 2–1 || Clemens (1–0) || Anderson (0–1) || Rivera (1) || Yankee Stadium || 55,820 || 1–2
|- align="center" bgcolor="bbffbb"
| 4 || October 31 || Diamondbacks || 4–3 (10) || Rivera (1–0) || Kim (0–1) || || Yankee Stadium || 55,863 || 2–2
|- align="center" bgcolor="bbffbb"
| 5 || November 1 || Diamondbacks || 3–2 (12) || Hitchcock (1–0) || Lopez (0–1) || || Yankee Stadium || 56,018 || 3–2
|- align="center" bgcolor="ffbbbb"
| 6 || November 3 || @ Diamondbacks || 2–15 || Johnson (2–0) || Pettitte (0–2) || || Bank One Ballpark || 49,707 || 3–3
|- align="center" bgcolor="ffbbbb"
| 7 || November 4 || @ Diamondbacks || 2–3 || Johnson (3–0) || Rivera' (1–1) || || Bank One Ballpark || 49,589 || 3–4
|-

Player stats

BattingNote: G = Games played; AB = At bats; R = Runs; H = Hits; HR = Home runs; RBI = Runs batted in; Avg. = Batting average; SB = Stolen bases Other battersNote: G = Games played; AB = At bats; R = Runs; H = Hits; HR = Home runs; RBI = Runs batted in; Avg. = Batting average; SB = Stolen basesStarting pitchersNote: G = Games pitched; IP = Innings pitched; W = Wins; L = Losses; ERA = Earned run average; CG = Complete games; SO = Strikeouts; BB = Walks allowedOther pitchersNote: G = Games pitched; IP = Innings pitched; W = Wins; L = Losses; ERA = Earned run average; SO = StrikeoutsRelief pitchersNote: G = Games pitched; IP = Innings pitched; W = Wins; L = Losses; SV = Saves; ERA = Earned run average; SO = Strikeouts; BB = Walks allowedALDS

Series Summary:
Game 1 @ Yankee Stadium: Athletics 5, Yankees 3
Game 2 @ Yankee Stadium: Athletics 2, Yankees 0
Game 3 @ Network Associates Coliseum: Yankees 1, Athletics 0
Game 4 @ Network Associates Coliseum: Yankees 9, Athletics 2
Game 5 @ Yankee Stadium: Yankees 5, Athletics 3
Yankees win series 3-2, becoming the first team in MLB history to win the ALDS after dropping the first two games at home.

ALCS

World series

Game 1
October 27, 2001 at Bank One Ballpark in Phoenix, Arizona

Game 2
October 28, 2001 at Bank One Ballpark in Phoenix, Arizona

Game 3
October 30, 2001 at Yankee Stadium in New York City

Game 4
October 31, 2001 at Yankee Stadium in New York City

Game 5
November 1, 2001 at Yankee Stadium in New York City

Game 6
November 3, 2001 at Bank One Ballpark in Phoenix, Arizona

Game 7
November 4, 2001 at Bank One Ballpark in Phoenix, Arizona

Awards and records
Roger Clemens became the first pitcher to reach his 20th win with only 1 loss.
Roger Clemens, AL Cy Young Award

Farm system

LEAGUE CHAMPIONS: GCL Yankees; LEAGUE CO-CHAMPIONS: Tampa

References

2001 New York Yankees at Baseball Reference2001 World Series
2001 New York Yankees at Baseball Almanac''

New York Yankees seasons
New York Yankees
New York Yankees
2000s in the Bronx
American League East champion seasons
American League champion seasons